King Edgar and Alfreda is a 1677 tragedy by the English writer Edward Ravenscroft. It was first staged by the King's Company at the Theatre Royal, Drury Lane. It is based on the life of the early English King Edwgar and his wife Alfreda.

The original cast included Michael Mohun as Edgar, Cardell Goodman as Ethelwold, Nicholas Burt as Ruthin, Thomas Clark as Aldernold, John Wiltshire as Oswold, Philip Griffin as  Durzo, Frances Maria Knight as The Queen and Elizabeth Boutell as Matilda.

References

Bibliography
 Van Lennep, W. The London Stage, 1660-1800: Volume One, 1660-1700. Southern Illinois University Press, 1960.

1677 plays
West End plays
Tragedy plays
Biographical plays
Plays set in the 10th century
Plays about British royalty
Plays by Edward Ravenscroft